The Rupes Mercator is an escarpment located on the Moon. It is named after the neighboring Mercator crater, a name assigned to it in 1935 by the International Astronomical Union in honor of the Flemish geographer and mathematician Gérard Mercator.

References

Escarpments on the Moon